YME can refer to:

Businesses and organisations
 Yahoo! Music Engine
 Yamaha Motor Company Europe
 Young Money Entertainment, a record label
 Y-ME National Breast Cancer Organization, a non-profit

Places
 Matane Airport, Quebec, Canada
 Yellow Medicine County, Minnesota, United States
 Yellow Medicine East High School, in Granite Falls
 Yme field, a small Norwegian oil field in the North Sea

Other uses
 Ymir (or Yme), a giant/jotun in Norse mythology
 Yme (name), a Dutch given name